Jostein Berntsen (born 5 February 1943) is a Norwegian politician for the Labour Party.

He was born in Rennebu as a son of smallholder Bjarne Kolbjørn Berntsen (1908–1980) and husmor Klara Halgunset (1911–1992). He worked as an agronomist and farmer. He was active in the Norwegian Farmers and Smallholders Union and the Norwegian Heart and Lung Patient Organisation.

He was a member of Rennebu municipal council from 1971 to 1977. He chaired the local party chapter from 1971 to 1977. He was elected to the Parliament of Norway from Sør-Trøndelag in 1977, and was re-elected on two occasions. He backed out ahead of the Norwegian parliamentary election of 1989 in protest of the party leadership. He called for the replacement of deputy party leader Einar Førde with Kjell Borgen, with the prospect of seeing Borgen as a future party leader. From 1992 to 1994 he was a board member of the Norwegian State Agriculture Bank.

References

1943 births
Living people
Members of the Storting
Sør-Trøndelag politicians
Labour Party (Norway) politicians
Norwegian farmers
People from Rennebu
20th-century Norwegian politicians